Kenny McKinna (born 21 October 1962) is a former international speedway rider from Scotland.

Speedway career 
McKinna reached the final of the British Speedway Championship in 1994. He rode in the top tier of British Speedway from 1979 to 1998, riding for various clubs.

Family
He came from a speedway family, with his brothers Charlie McKinna and Martin McKinna both being speedway riders. His son Adam McKinna was also a speedway rider.

References 

Living people
1968 births
British speedway riders
Scottish speedway riders
Belle Vue Aces riders
Edinburgh Monarchs riders
Eastbourne Eagles riders
Glasgow Tigers riders
Ipswich Witches riders
Middlesbrough Bears riders
Wolverhampton Wolves riders